This is a list of crime films released in 1994.

References

1994